Mojtaba Musavi Lari (1925 – 9 March 2013) was a Shi'a Twelver Islamic scholar.

Biography
Lari was born in Lar, Iran, to the late Ayatulla Sayyid Ali Asghar Lari. After completing his preliminary studies in Lar in 1953 he continued his Islamic studies in Qom. In 1963, he received medical treatment in Germany, and later wrote Western Civilization Through Muslim Eyes, which was reprinted in several languages.

In 1964 Lari founded a charity in Lar for helping the poor and spreading Islam among youth in rural areas. Members of the charity traveled across Iran, teaching Islam and donating clothes, books and writing tools. The charity also built mosques, schools and clinics in small towns and villages.

Works
Ethics and Spiritual Growth
God and His Attributes: Lessons on Islamic Doctrine
Imamate and Leadership: Lessons on Islamic Doctrine (1996), English translation by Hamid Algar
Resurrection Judgement and the Hereafter: Lessons on Islamic Doctrine
Seal of the Prophets and His Message: Lessons on Islamic Doctrine
Hidden Truths in God's Word
Youth and Morals
Western Civilization through Muslim Eyes

See also
List of Islamic scholars

References

External links

 https://www.al-islam.org/person/sayyid-mujtaba-musavi-lari
 Official site

Iranian Shia scholars of Islam
Al-Moussawi family
1925 births
2013 deaths